Martyn Bedford (born 1959) is a British novelist and literary critic.

Life and career
He is an alumnus of the University of East Anglia.

The first twelve years of Martyn Bedford's writing career were spent as a journalist on regional newspapers.
His initial book Acts of Revision won the Yorkshire Post “Best First Work” Award.
He later became the director of the novel writing programme at the University of Manchester, and is fiction critic for the Literary Review.
Currently, Bedford teaches the Creative Writing module at Leeds Trinity University.

In 2008–10, he was Academic Writer-in-Residence, Royal Literary Fund Fellow.
Bedford lives in Ilkley, West Yorkshire, with his wife and two daughters.

Awards and honours
 2011: Costa Book Awards, shortlist, Flip

Bibliography
 Acts of Revision (Doubleday, 1996)
 Exit, Orange & Red (Bantam, 1997)
 The Houdini Girl (Random House, 1999)
 Black Cat (Viking, 2000)
 The Virtual Disappearance of Miriam (digital narrative, 2000)
 The Island of Lost Souls (Bloomsbury, 2006)
 Flip (Walker, 2011)
 Never Ending (Walker, 2014)
 Twenty Questions for Gloria (Walker, 2016)

References

External links
 Official website

1959 births
Living people
English male journalists
21st-century English novelists
People from Ilkley
Alumni of the University of East Anglia
Academics of the University of Manchester
People associated with Leeds Trinity University
English male short story writers
English short story writers
English male novelists
21st-century British short story writers
21st-century English male writers